Beaver Island is an island in Antarctica,  long and  wide, situated on the south flank of Beaver Glacier in Amundsen Bay. It was first visited in 1956 by an Australian National Antarctic Research Expeditions party led by P.W. Crohn, and so named because of its proximity to Beaver Glacier.

References
 

Islands of Enderby Land